The Chery QQ Ice Cream is a battery electric city car manufactured by Chery since 2021.

Overview
The Chery QQ Ice Cream was first showed in July 2021 in an ice cream-themed camouflage wrap and was described by the automaker as an SUV. The QQ Ice Cream was later revealed at the Chengdu Auto Show in August as the fourth new nameplate under the Chery QQ series of a small cars, intended to be a competitor of the slightly-smaller and similarly-shaped Wuling Hongguang Mini EV. The QQ Ice Cream is marketed towards the female car buyer demographic, and a variant ride-sharing companies is planned to be offered. The QQ Ice Cream is expected to be sold at a starting price of ¥30.000 ($4,655) and will be one of the cheapest EVs to be on sale in China.

The QQ Ice Cream is the first Chery vehicle to use the automaker's iCar Ecology technology, which has signed deals with Chinese electronic manufacturer Haier and cloud computing company Alibaba Cloud to develop cloud-based internet of things services and connect the car to internet-connected devices at home or the office as well as nearby businesses.

The QQ Ice Cream was launched in the Philippines in 2023 under the Jetour badge.

Specifications
The Chery QQ Ice Cream is powered by a 27 hp Chery TZ160XFDM13A electric motor, which uses a lithium iron phosphate battery pack.

Concepts
At the Chengdu Auto Show, Chery presented a racing-inspired concept alongside and based on the QQ Ice Cream, called the Chery QQ Ice Cream Lightning Edition. It features components such as a large rear wing, fender add-ons, side skirts, splitters, turbofan wheels, and a modified grille.

See also
 Chery eQ1, another electric microcar by Chery Automobile

References

External links

Production electric cars
QQ Ice Cream
Cars introduced in 2021
Cars of China